Pagan Love is a 1920 American silent romantic drama film produced and directed by Hugo Ballin and starring his wife Mabel Ballin, Togo Yamamoto, and Rockliffe Fellowes. Its alternate title is The Honourable Gentleman, which is also the title of the short story by Achmed Abdullah that it is based on. The W. W. Hodkinson Corporation and Pathé Exchange handled the distribution.

Cast
Togo Yamamoto as Tsing Yu-Ch'ing
Mabel Ballin as Kathleen Levinsky
Rockliffe Fellowes as Dr. Hartwick
Charles Fang as The Hatchetman
Nellie Fillmore as Mrs. O'Grady

Preservation status
The National Archives of Canada in Ottawa has a copy of this film.

References

External links

1920 films
American silent feature films
Films directed by Hugo Ballin
Films based on short fiction
American black-and-white films
American romantic drama films
1920s romantic drama films
Films distributed by W. W. Hodkinson Corporation
1920s American films
English-language romantic drama films